Stephen John Young  (born 1951) is a British researcher, Professor of Information Engineering at the University of Cambridge and an entrepreneur. He is one of the pioneers of automated speech recognition and statistical spoken dialogue systems. He served as the Senior Pro-Vice-Chancellor of the University of Cambridge from 2009 to 2015, responsible for planning and resources. From 2015 to 2019, he held a joint appointment between his professorship at Cambridge and Apple, where he was a senior member of the Siri development team.

Early life and education

Young was born in Liverpool on 23 January 1951. He studied at the University of Cambridge, completing a BA in Electrical Sciences in 1973 and a PhD in speech recognition in 1978, under the supervision of Professor Frank Fallside at the Engineering Department. He held lectureships at both Manchester and Cambridge before being elected to the Chair of Information Engineering at Cambridge University in 1994.

Research and academic career 
He is best known as the leading author of the HTK toolkit, a software package for using hidden Markov models to model time series, mainly used for speech recognition. Its first version was originally developed by Young at the Machine Intelligence Laboratory of the Cambridge University Engineering Department (CUED) in 1989. Due to the growing popularity of the toolkit worldwide, Microsoft decided to make the core HTK toolkit available again and licensed the software back to CUED after its acquisition of Entropic, the startup Steve co-founded in 1993 to distribute and maintain the HTK toolkit. The HTK book, which is the tutorial of the HTK toolkit, has received more than 7,000 citations.

In the late nineties, Young's research interests shifted to the design of statistical spoken dialogue systems. His most notable contribution to the field is the partially observable Markov decision process (POMDP) based dialogue management framework, which includes the Hidden Information State (HIS) dialogue model, the first practical dialogue management model based on the POMDP framework. His research focuses on developing spoken dialogue systems that are robust against noise introduced by noisy speech recognisers, as well as adapt and scale on-line in interaction with real users. One notable instance of this approach is the application of Gaussian process based reinforcement learning for rapid policy optimisation. In recent years, Young's research group has successfully applied deep learning techniques to various submodules of statistical dialogue systems, winning multiple best paper awards at prestigious speech and NLP conferences.

Entrepreneurship 
Apart from his academic and scientific contributions, Young is also a successful entrepreneur and he took a leading role in three company acquisitions:
  Entropic, a speech recognition software company that developed applications for voice-enabling the web via mobile operators. The company was acquired by Microsoft in 1999.
 Phonetic Arts, a speech synthesis company that delivered technology for generating natural expressive speech. The technology developed by the company allowed computer games to say various sentences with different kinds of voices. Phonetic arts was acquired by Google in 2010.
 VocalIQ, a dialogue technology company that built the world's first dialogue system application programming interface. The company's technology provided a platform for voice interfaces, allowing businesses to voice-enable mobile devices and proprietary apps. VocalIQ was acquired by Apple in 2015.

Awards and honours 
Young is a Fellow of the Royal Academy of Engineering, the Institution of Engineering and Technology (IET), the Institute of Electrical and Electronics Engineers (IEEE), the RSA and the International Speech Communication Association (ISCA).

He received the IEEE Signal Processing Society Technical Achievement Award in 2004, and the ISCA Medal for Scientific Achievement in 2010. He also received the European Signal Processing Society Individual Technical Achievement Award in 2013, and the IEEE James L Flanagan Speech and Audio Processing Award in 2015.

In 2020 he was elected a Fellow of the Royal Society (FRS) 

Young was appointed Commander of the Order of the British Empire (CBE) in the 2022 Birthday Honours for services to software engineering.

References 

1951 births
Living people
British computer scientists
Engineering professors at the University of Cambridge
Alumni of the University of Cambridge
Fellow Members of the IEEE
Fellows of the Royal Society
Fellows of the Royal Academy of Engineering
British software engineers
Commanders of the Order of the British Empire